Varhaňovce is a village and municipality in Prešov District in the Prešov Region of eastern Slovakia.

Population 
It has a population of 1,550 people (2020-12-31).

References 

Villages and municipalities in Prešov District
Šariš